Hammad Miah (born 6 July 1993) is a British professional  snooker player of Bangladeshi-origin.

In May 2013, Miah qualified for the 2013–14 and 2014–15 professional Main Tour as one of four semi-finalists from the first Q School event. Hammad Miah is based at Whetstone Snooker Club in Barnet, England. In June 2021 he regained his card through the Q school order of merit for the 2021-22 and 2022-23 seasons.

Career

Debut season
Miah's first win as a professional was a 5–4 victory over Sydney Wilson in the first qualifying round of the 2013 Australian Goldfields Open, before losing 2–5 to Gerard Greene. He made his debut in a ranking event at the Indian Open by beating Jimmy Robertson 4–3 in the qualifying event, then beat Chen Zhe in the first round, again by a single frame. Miah played local favourite Aditya Mehta in the second round and lost 1–4. He lost in the first round of the UK Championship and Welsh Open 2–6 to Andrew Higginson and 3–4 to Xiao Guodong respectively. Miah also met Xiao in the first round of the China Open and was beaten again this time 2–5.

2014/2015 season
Miah had a poor 2014–15 season as he could only win one match all year and lost his place on the tour as was placed 100th in the world rankings, well outside top 64 who remain. Miah tried to win his place back at Q School and came closest to doing so in the second event when he lost 2–4 to Paul Davison in the penultimate round.

2015/2016 season
Miah's Q School Order of Merit gave him entry into the 2015 Australian Goldfields Open qualifiers in which he began with a century break and won his first ranking event match in almost a year by beating Jason Weston 5–2. He lost 1–5 to Anthony Hamilton in the subsequent round. He was eliminated in the third round of three European Tour events during the season, which included scoring 4–3 wins over Mark Davis and Judd Trump. This saw him finish 60th on the Order of Merit to secure a new two-year tour card starting next season.

2016/2017 season
Miah edged out Martin Gould 5–4 to qualify for the 2016 World Open, but lost in the wildcard round once in China. Wins over Kurt Dunham, Tian Pengfei and Rory McLeod helped him reach the final qualifying round for the Shanghai Masters and he was beaten 0–5 by Matthew Selt. Miah was 0–3 down to Tom Ford in the opening round of the UK Championship, before levelling at 3–3 in a run which included a century break. He was also 3–5 behind, but came back to win 6–5. A second final frame decider came in the next round against Robert Milkins with Miah losing it. Afterwards Milkins said Miah was not a real snooker player after the pair exchanged words at the end of the match.
Miah shocked world number 22 Ricky Walden 10–7 in World Championship qualifying and, after beating Martin O'Donnell 10–7, a match up with Rory McLeod awaited with the winner reaching the Crucible. Miah lost the first seven frames, before taking six in a row. He would ultimately be defeated 7–10.

2017/2018 season
He dropped off the tour at the end of 2017/18 but entered Q School in an attempt to rejoin immediately.
He won event 1 of Q School meaning he has a pro tour card for at least two years.

Performance and rankings timeline

References

External links

Hammad Miah at worldsnooker.com
 
 Hammad Miah results history

English snooker players
Living people
1993 births
People from Hertford
British people of Bangladeshi descent